Our Lady of Mercy College, Parramatta (abbreviated as OLMC and OLMC Parramatta), is an independent Roman Catholic single-sex secondary day school for girls, located in Parramatta, a western suburb of Sydney, New South Wales, Australia. The college is adjacent to  St. Patrick's Cathedral.

Established in 1889 in the Mercy tradition, and based on the Gospel values of mercy and justice, the college caters for approximately 1,030 students from Year 7 to Year 12.

OLMC is affiliated with the Combined Catholic Colleges, the Catholic Girls Secondary Schools Sporting Association, the Alliance of Girls' Schools Australasia, the Australasian Mercy Secondary Schools Association (AMSSA), the Association of Heads of Independent Schools of Australia (AHISA), and an affiliate member of the Association of Heads of Independent Girls' Schools (AHIGS).

History 
The college was founded by a group of Mercy sisters from Callan, County Kilkenny, Ireland. The Sisters of Mercy were invited to come run a Catholic school in Parramatta. Mother Mary Clare Dunphy led the sea voyage from Ireland to Australia in 1889. They opened the school on its present site in January 1889, with seven high school students and Mother M. Alacoque Kavanagh as the founding Principal. Previous to this, the school had been ministered by the Sisters of Mercy from North Sydney and was known as 'St Mary's High School'. The school had both a co-educational primary school and a girls' high school. Subjects taught included English, Latin, modern languages, mathematics, singing, elocution, physical culture, freehand and geometrical drawing, painting, music, needlework, and woodcarving.

Within the first two years the school was extended along Villiers Street, and three students sat for and passed the Civil Service Entrance Examination. A student of the college was awarded the Trinity College Colony Medal for piano in 1894.

In 1892, the college accepted its first boarder and by 1899, a new wing was built along Villiers Street to accommodate the increasing number of classes and boarders. In 1911, there were 101 pupils enrolled at the college, but by the mid-1920s, this had almost trebled.

OLMC was one of the first schools in New South Wales to be registered for the Tate Langdon Act in 1913, which introduced the more competitive exam orientated approach to education of the Intermediate and Leaving Certificate years. The first group of students sat for the Leaving Certificate in 1914.

In 1922, Dorrie Murphy convinced Mother Francis Kearney to support the foundation of an Ex-Students' Association. As well as being a way of maintaining school friendships, the Association raised funds for the charitable works of the Sisters. Dorrie is also credited with penning the words of the school song, "The Alma Mater", to the tune of a popular beer hall song. The tradition of the Ex-students' Association was extended in 2004 when the OLMC Parramatta Alumnae was created. This was a direct result of the incorporation of the college and the appointment of a board of directors in 2002 by the trustees of the Sisters of Mercy Parramatta.

By 1929, the expansion of the school led to the erection of a new building in order to accommodate the 150 borders and 200 day pupils. This building has been named 'The Brigid Shelley Building' in recognition of one of the early Sisters. Further expansion has taken place over the years as more land has become available. Major building occurred in 1939, 1967 ('Francis Kearney Building', 1969 'Catherine McAuley Library and Hall') and 1994 ('Martha O'Sullivan Technology Wing'). There has also been refurbishment in recent years. The hall was refurbished and named 'The Edith Angel Hall' in 2006 in recognition of the leadership of Sister Edith Angel during the 1960s. A master plan which includes building works began in 2007.

In 1955, the primary school was to phased out and the boarding school closed at the end of 1974. This was to help the college update its facilities for the implementation of the Wyndham Scheme. This new education policy made the subject of science compulsory for all students to the end of Year 10, and introduced another year to the high school program so that it now covered six years instead of five.

In 1996, the college was set alight by the same arsonist who set fire to Saint Patrick's Cathedral minutes before. The fire in the school was discovered in time and put out with little damage done.

In 2002, the college was incorporated and the first Board of Directors was appointed, with Geraldine Star as the first college chair. In 2004, Kitty Guerin was appointed the eighth principal of the college

In 2010 a new building was constructed - the Janet Woods Building, named after a former principal of the college and science teacher, Sister Janet Woods. The building provides facilities in science, food technology and hospitality, and a library, senior study and canteen.

Principals

Notable alumni 
Helena Carr (née John) – businesswoman
Melanie Silva; Managing Director and VP, Google Australia & New Zealand
Kate McKenzie (née McGee) – Group Managing Director of Telstra wholesale; former Director General of NSW Department of Commerce, Group Manager of WorkCover, and Deputy Director General of NSW Cabinet office
Sheila Cassidy – human rights activist; arrested and tortured in Chile in the 1970s
Alison Megarrity – ALP member for Menai in the New South Wales Legislative Assembly
Rosemary Goldie -  Australian Roman Catholic theologian and the first woman to serve in an executive role in the Roman Curia
Michelle Rowland - ALP member for Greenway in the Australian House of Representatives
Susie Youssef - Australian comedian

See also 

 List of Catholic schools in New South Wales
 Catholic Education, Diocese of Parramatta
 Catholic education in Australia

References

External links 

 OLMC website

Educational institutions established in 1889
Catholic secondary schools in Sydney
Girls' schools in New South Wales
Association of Heads of Independent Girls' Schools
1889 establishments in Australia
Roman Catholic Diocese of Parramatta
Schools in Parramatta
Sisters of Mercy schools
Alliance of Girls' Schools Australasia